Harrison Township is one of the fourteen townships of Carroll County, Ohio, United States. As of the 2020 census, the population was 2,397.

Geography
Located in the west central part of the county, it borders the following townships:
Brown Township - north
Augusta Township - northeast corner
Washington Township - east
Center Township - southeast, north of Union Township
Union Township - southeast, south of Center Township
Monroe Township - southwest
Rose Township - west

No municipalities are located in Harrison Township. The unincorporated community New Harrisburg is located centrally.

Name and history
It is one of nineteen Harrison Townships statewide.

In 1817, Harrison Township was formed from a part of Sandy Township in Stark County. The township originally was within Stark County until the formation of Carroll County. It had all of the original surveyed township 15, range 6 of the Old Seven Ranges, until the county commissioners took four and one-half sections in the formation of Centre (later Center) township.

A route of the Underground Railroad passed through the township along Baxter Ridge.

Government

The township is governed by a three-member board of trustees, who are elected in November of odd-numbered years to a four-year term beginning on the following January 1. Two are elected in the year after the presidential election and one is elected in the year before it. There is also an elected township fiscal officer, who serves a four-year term beginning on April 1 of the year after the election, which is held in November of the year before the presidential election. Vacancies in the fiscal officership or on the board of trustees are filled by the remaining trustees.

Education
Students attend the Carrollton Exempted Village School District in most of the township and Brown Local School District in a corner of the township.

Notable residents
Isaac H. Taylor — lawyer, judge, and single-term U.S. Representative
Jonathan Weaver - 19th century bishop of the Church of the United Brethren in Christ.

References

External links
County website

Townships in Carroll County, Ohio
Populated places on the Underground Railroad
Populated places established in 1817
1817 establishments in Ohio
Townships in Ohio